Jon Thomas "Sunny" Sundvold (born July 2, 1961) is an American former professional basketball player who was selected by the Seattle SuperSonics in the first round (16th pick overall) of the 1983 NBA draft. A 6'2" shooting guard from the University of Missouri, Sundvold played in 9 NBA seasons from 1983–1992. He played for the Sonics, San Antonio Spurs and Miami Heat.

Early life
Though born in South Dakota, Sundvold grew up in Blue Springs, Missouri, in suburban Kansas City, where his father Robert was a successful home builder.
While a player at Blue Springs High School, Sundvold scored over 2,100 points and was twice selected to the All-State team. He earned a basketball scholarship to Mizzou where he played all four years for Norm Stewart's Tigers. As a senior, he averaged nearly 20 points per game and made 87-percent of his free-throw attempts. Sundvold is one of only two Missouri players to play on four consecutive Big 8 Conference championship teams and was an All-American in 1983. Sundvold also played for the US national team in the 1982 FIBA World Championship, winning the silver medal. Sundvold's older brother Bob is a college basketball coach.

NBA career
Drafted by Seattle in the 1983 draft, Jon Sundvold made an immediate impact by helping the SuperSonics earn an NBA Playoff berth in his first season. Sundvold's best year as a professional came during the 1986–87 season as a member of the Spurs, appearing in 76 games and averaging 11.2 ppg. Selected by the Miami Heat in the 1988 NBA Expansion Draft, Sundvold played more of a bench role but still led the NBA in three point shooting percentage in 1989, hitting more than 50-percent of his attempts. He also participated in the NBA All Star Three Point Contest in 1989 and 1990. A neck injury forced a premature end to his playing career in 1992. In his NBA career, Sundvold appeared in 502 games and scored a total of 3,886 points.

Post-playing days
After his nine-year NBA career came to a close Sundvold returned to Columbia, Missouri and put his degree in finance from MU to use.  He first worked full-time for BC Christopher Securities, where he'd already been working part-time during the basketball off-season. In 1997 Sundvold stepped out on his own, establishing the investment firm, Sundvold Capital Management. Despite no longer being active on the court, Sundvold has stayed close to the game he loves as a former college basketball analyst for ESPN and CBS and is currently heard as a color analyst on MU Tiger games broadcast by the Missouri Sports Network. Sundvold and wife Tamara are the parents of one son and two daughters and reside in the Columbia, Missouri area. On June 8, 2016, Sundvold was named to the MU Board of Curators by Governor Jay Nixon.

Honors
 University of Missouri Athletics Hall of Fame inductee, 1990.
 University of Missouri Basketball All-Century team member.
 Member, National Federation of State High School Associations Hall of Fame.

References

External links

1961 births
Living people
All-American college men's basketball players
American men's basketball players
Basketball players from South Dakota
College basketball announcers in the United States
Miami Heat expansion draft picks
Miami Heat players
Missouri Tigers men's basketball players
People from Blue Springs, Missouri
San Antonio Spurs players
Seattle SuperSonics draft picks
Seattle SuperSonics players
Shooting guards
Sportspeople from the Kansas City metropolitan area
Sportspeople from Sioux Falls, South Dakota
United States men's national basketball team players
1982 FIBA World Championship players